Gamar Malamo Airport  is the main airport serving the city of Galela, Indonesia. The airport has flights operated by Wings Air of Indonesia to Manado in Indonesia. The airport is owned by Government of Indonesia and operated by Unit Penyelenggara Bandar Udara.

Terminals and facilities
The airport has one terminal for passengers departing from or arriving into the airport.

Airlines and destinations

References

Airports in North Maluku